Pitt is a surname of English origin.

List of people with the surname Pitt
Used as a surname, Pitt most commonly refers to the following people:
Brad Pitt (born 1963), American actor
William Pitt, 1st Earl of Chatham (William Pitt the Elder) (1708–1778), Prime Minister of Great Britain (1766–1768)
William Pitt the Younger (1759–1806), son of the above and Prime Minister of Great Britain (1783–1801) and of the United Kingdom (1801 and 1804–1806)

Pitt may also refer to the following people:
Andrew Pitt, motorcycle racer from New South Wales, Australia
Angela Pitt (born 1981), Canadian provincial politician from Alberta
Bernard Pitt (1882-1916), British teacher, poet and army officer
Christopher Pitt (1699–1748), English poet and translator
Courtney Pitt (born 1981), English footballer
David Pitt, Baron Pitt of Hampstead (1913–1994), civil rights campaigner and Labour politician in the United Kingdom
George Pitt (disambiguation), several people
Harvey Pitt (born 1945), former chairman of the U.S. Securities and Exchange Commission (SEC)
Ingrid Pitt (1937–2010), Polish actress in horror films of the 1960s and 70s
John Pitt (disambiguation), several people
Kalanimoku (1768–1827), prominent Hawaiian official given the name William Pitt by visiting Europeans
Malcolm Pitt (1897–1985), American college sports coach
Michael Pitt (born 1981), American actor
Redding Pitt (1944–2016), attorney and chairman of the Alabama Democratic Party
Thomas Pitt (1653–1726), English merchant, grandfather of Pitt the Elder
Thomas Pitt, 1st Baron Camelford (1737–1793), elder brother of Pitt the Elder
Thomas Pitt, 2nd Baron Camelford (1775–1804), son of the 1st Baron Camelford
Turia Pitt (1987-), Australian mining engineer, athlete, motivational speaker, and author
William Pitt (architect) (1855–1918), architect working in Melbourne, Australia
William Pitt (engineer) (1840–1909), of New Brunswick, Canada, inventor of the underwater cable ferry in the early 1900s
William Fox-Pitt (born 1969), British three-day eventing rider
Bill Pitt (politician) (1937–2017), British politician; Liberal Member of Parliament, 1981–1983
William Rivers Pitt (born 1971), leftist author and essayist

References

English-language surnames
Surnames of English origin